Rathcoole may refer to:

 Rathcoole, County Dublin, a village in County Dublin, Ireland
 Rathcoole (Newtownabbey), a large housing estate in Newtownabbey, County Antrim, Northern Ireland
 Rathcoole, County Cork, a village in north west Cork
 Rathcoole, County Kilkenny, a parish in County Kilkenny
 Rathcoole Aerodrome, County Cork, Ireland